"Dreamworld" is a song by Australian rock band Midnight Oil released in 1987 as the fourth and final single from their sixth studio album, Diesel and Dust. In the United States, the song reached No. 16 on the Modern Rock chart and No. 37 on the Mainstream Rock chart.

The song laments the loss of much of Queensland's built heritage — including the Cloudland Dance Hall, where Midnight Oil had frequently performed — which was demolished under the then-ruling Joh Bjelke-Petersen state government. Prior to the song being released, the band performed a version with some alternative lyrics at the Live @ RMIT, Melbourne, Australia - March 7, 1987 concert. The Dreamworld theme park, which inspired the song's name, is briefly shown in the music video. The video also includes demolition footage of the above-mentioned built heritage.

Track listings
7"
 "Dreamworld" - 3:36 
 "Short Memory" - 4:54

12"
 "Dreamworld" - 3:36	
 "Short Memory" - 4:54
 "Beds are Burning"  (Tamarama Mix)  - 8:04

Chart performance

Weekly Charts

Year-end charts

References

Midnight Oil songs
Protest songs
1987 singles
1987 songs
Songs written by Rob Hirst
Songs written by Jim Moginie
Songs written by Peter Garrett
Columbia Records singles